Aksaray is a rapid transit station on the M1 line of the Istanbul Metro. It is located in central Fatih under Adnan Menderes Boulevard near Aksaray square. Aksaray was opened on 3 September 1989 as part of the first rapid transit line in Istanbul and Turkey. Between 1989 and 2014, Aksaray was the eastern terminus of the M1. From Aksaray connection to the T1 tram line is available via a short walk to Yusufpaşa station. Connections to İETT bus service are also available.

Layout

References

Railway stations opened in 1989
1989 establishments in Turkey
Istanbul metro stations
Fatih